Brian Kellett is an English former professional rugby league footballer who played in the 1980s.

Club career
Brian Kellett made his début for Featherstone Rovers on Sunday 19 January 1986, and he played his last match for Featherstone Rovers during the 1986–87 season.

References

1959 births
Living people
English rugby league players
Featherstone Rovers players
Mansfield Marksman players
People from Hemsworth
Rugby league fullbacks
Rugby league players from Wakefield
Rugby league wingers